The 1994 NCAA Division II Men's Soccer Championship was the 23rd annual tournament held by the NCAA to determine the top men's Division II college soccer program in the United States.

Tampa (15-2-1) defeated Oakland, 3–0, in the final, following two overtime periods. This was the second national title for the Spartans, who were coached by future Columbus Crew manager Tom Fitzgerald.

Bracket

Final

See also  
 NCAA Division I Men's Soccer Championship
 NCAA Division III Men's Soccer Championship
 NAIA Men's Soccer Championship

References 

NCAA Division II Men's Soccer Championship
NCAA Division II Men's Soccer Championship
NCAA Division II Men's Soccer Championship
NCAA Division II Men's Soccer Championship
Tampa Spartans men's soccer